
Gmina Bralin is a rural gmina (administrative district) in Kępno County, Greater Poland Voivodeship, in west-central Poland.

Villages
Gmina Bralin contains the villages and settlements of Bralin, Chojęcin, Czermin, Działosze, Gola, Mnichowice, Nosale, Nowa Wieś Książęca, Tabor Mały, Tabor Wielki and Weronikopole.

Neighbouring gminas
Gmina Bralin is bordered by the gminas of Baranów, Kępno, Kobyla Góra, Perzów and Rychtal.

References
Polish official population figures 2006

Bralin
Kępno County